The 2011 12U Baseball World Championship was an under-12 international baseball tournament held from July 8 to July 17, 2011 in Taipei City, Taiwan. It was the first 12U Baseball World Championship ever and was won by the host, Chinese Taipei.

Teams
Fourteen teams accepted the invitation for the tournament. Originally, Zimbabwe would appear in Group B, but the team withdrew from the tournament on the opening day.

 
 Chinese Taipei is the official IBAF designation for the team representing the state officially referred to as the Republic of China, more commonly known as Taiwan. (See also political status of Taiwan for details.)

Round 1

Group A

Standings

Schedule and results

Group B

Standings

Schedule and results

Round 2

5th to 8th place semifinals

Semifinals

Finals

11th place game

9th place game

7th place game

5th place game

Bronze medal game

Gold medal game

Final standings

See also
 List of sporting events in Taiwan

References

External links
2011 12U Baseball World Championship Official Website
 2011 12U Baseball World Championship Official Website From IBAF

12U Baseball World Championship
12U Baseball World Championship
2011
12U Baseball World Championship
U-12 Baseball World Cup
12U Baseball World Championship
2010s in Taipei
Sports competitions in Taipei